Kenneth Edward Henson (March 28, 1947 – May 24, 2007), better known as Ken E Henson, (and sometimes Kenny Henson), was a South African singer, guitarist, sitar player, and composer. He co-founded the progressive rock bands Freedom's Children and Abstract Truth. He later formed the duo Finch & Henson with the late Brian Finch.

Biography 

Ken E Henson was born in Durban, South Africa on March 28, 1947. He began playing guitar at the age of 10, and formed his first group, Leemen Ltd, in 1963.

Henson's first notable band was Freedom's Children, a group he formed in 1966 with bassist Ramsay Mackay and drummer Colin Pratley. After releasing just two songs with Freedom's Children, he left the band in 1968 to join The Bats for a six-week sojourn. In 1969 he formed the group Abstract Truth with Mike Dickman and Pete Measroch. With Abstract Truth he released three albums from 1969 to 1971. With Brian Finch, he formed Finch & Henson, a duo that toured South Africa extensively from 1971 to 1981. The duo continued to perform periodically until Henson's death.

In the last two decades of his career, Henson worked with many South African musicians, including Piet Botha, Steve Fataar, Neill Solomon, Roger Lucey, Nibs van der Spuy.

Death 

Henson died on May 24, 2007 at the age of 60 after suffering from emphysema.

Discography

Freedom's Children
Singles
1967: "The Coffee Song"
1967: "(I Can't Get No) Satisfaction"
Album
1990: A New Day

Abstract Truth
Albums
1970: Totum
1970: Silver Trees
Compilations
1970: Cool Sounds For Heads
2005: Silver Trees & Totum

Finch and Henson
Albums
1976: Playgrounds in Paradise
1978: High Octane
1979: Recycled
1980: At Home in the Dark
Singles
1977: "Free & Easy" (7")
1978: "Love You A Little More Every Day" (7", Single)
1980: "Oh Brother (You´ve Got A Long Way To Go)" (7", Single)

As Ken E Henson or Kenny Henson
1974: Bringing Back The Good Times – Brian Finch, featuring Henson
1977: Let Us Become Men – as Kenny Henson
1977: Playgrounds in Paradise
1978: High Octane
1978: Giving A Little Away – Ken E Henson's Harambee
1979: Recycled
1980: At Home in the Dark 
1993: Free And Easy – The Very Best Of Finch And Henson
2002: Hero of Heroes – Brian Finch, featuring Henson
2002: Another Time, Another Place 
2003: Never Look Back – Brian Finch, featuring Henson
2003: Bringing Back The Good Times (re-issue) – Brian Finch, featuring Henson

References 

1947 births
2007 deaths
South African rock musicians
Sitar players
Deaths from emphysema